Matías Ignacio Sepúlveda Méndez (born 12 March 1999) is a Chilean football player who plays as midfielder for Audax Italiano in Chilean Primera División.

International career
At under-20 level, Sepúlveda represented Chile in both the 2018 South American Games, winning the gold medal, and the 2019 South American Championship.

Honours
Chile U20
 South American Games Gold medal: 2018

References

1999 births
Living people
Chilean footballers
Chile under-20 international footballers
Chilean Primera División players
O'Higgins F.C. footballers
Association football midfielders
South American Games gold medalists for Chile
South American Games medalists in football
Competitors at the 2018 South American Games